Penicillium coprobium is an anamorph fungus species of the genus of Penicillium which produces pyripyropene A, roquefortine C, penicillic acid and patulin.

See also
List of Penicillium species

Further reading

References

coprobium
Fungi described in 1989